was a village located in Minamiazumi District, 
Nagano Prefecture, Japan.

As of 2003, the village had an estimated population of 2,534 and a density of 6.31 persons per km². The total area was 401.50 km².

On April 1, 2005, Azumi, along with the village of Shiga, from Higashichikuma District, and the villages of Azusagawa and Nagawa (all from Minamiazumi District), was merged into the expanded city of Matsumoto.

Dissolved municipalities of Nagano Prefecture
Matsumoto, Nagano